The Canterbury Water Management Strategy is being developed in Canterbury, New Zealand to address water related issues in the region.

It was initiated by the Ministry of Agriculture and Forestry, Ministry for the Environment and Environment Canterbury after a drought in 1998. Leadership for the strategy is from the Canterbury Mayoral Forum.

The outcome of the Canterbury Water Management Strategy was given as the reason for the Hurunui Water Project to defer resource consent hearings for a year for water takes of the Hurunui River.

See also
Water pollution in the Canterbury Region
Water in New Zealand
Environment of New Zealand

References

External links
Canterbury Water Management Strategy
Environment Canterbury - What is the Canterbury Water Management Strategy?

Environmental policy in New Zealand
Environment of Canterbury, New Zealand
Water in New Zealand